1945 in professional wrestling describes the year's events in the world of professional wrestling.

List of notable promotions 
Only one promotion held notable shows in 1945.

Calendar of notable shows

Championship changes

EMLL

Debuts
Debut date uncertain:
Cora Combs
Don Eagle

Births
Date of birth unknown:
Sonny King (wrestler)
January 10  Colonel DeBeers
January 18  Pete Doherty
January 19  Buck Robley(died in 2013)
January 27  Cuban Assassin
February 17   Chris Dolman 
February 27  Bill White (died in 2021) 
March 9  Cocoa Samoa (died in 2007)
March 18  Claude Roca 
March 30:
Ronnie Garvin
S. D. Jones(died in 2008)
April 5  Sika Anoa'i
May 28  Clem Turner (died in 2009) 
May 29  Fray Tormenta
June 4   Johnny Kincaid 
June 14  Dan Kroffat
July 30  Onno Boelee (died in 2013)
August 24  Vince McMahon
August 25  Bobby Shane (died in 1975) 
September 26  Marty Jones
October 12  Dusty Rhodes(died in 2015)
October 27  Miss Linda
October 30  Ron Slinker (died in 2008) 
November 1  Bugsy McGraw
November 26   Victor Jovica
December 9  Tugboat Taylor (died in 2017) 
December 15  Katsuji Ueda (died in 2017)
December 22  Toni Rose

References

 
professional wrestling